Parantaka Chola I (Tamil : பராந்தக சோழன் I) (873 CE–955 CE) was a Chola emperor who ruled for forty-eight years, annexing Pandya by defeating Rajasimhan II and in the deccan won the battle of Vallala against Rashtrakutas which happened before 916 CE. The best part of his reign was marked by increasing success and prosperity.

Invasion of the Pandya kingdom
Parantaka I continued the expansion started by his father, and invaded the Pandya kingdom in 915. He captured the Pandyan capital Madurai and assumed the title Madurain-konda (Capturer of Madurai). The Pandyan ruler Maravarman Rajasinha II sought the help of Kassapa V of Anuradhapura who sent an army to his aid. Parantaka I defeated the combined army at the battle of Vellore. The Pandya king fled into exile in Sri Lanka and Parantaka I completed his conquest of the entire Pandya country.

Parantaka I spent many years in the newly conquered country reducing it to subjugation, and when he felt he had at last achieved his aim, he wanted to celebrate his victory by a coronation in Madurai in which he was to invest himself with the insignia of Pandyan monarchy. However he was failed in this attempt by the Pandyan king, who had carried them away and left them in the safe custody of the Lankan king. Towards the end of his reign, Parantaka I tried to capture them by invading Lanka. Mahavamsa records that the Lankan king Udaya IV took the Pandya crown and the jewels and hid himself in the Rohana hills. Parantaka I's armies had to return empty handed.

After his exploits in the Pandya country and in Lanka, he took the title of Maduraiyum Eelamum Konda Parakesarivarman – Parakesarivarman who conquered Madurai and Sri Lanka.

War against Rashtrakutas  
Aditya I had two sons namely Parantaka I and Kannara Deva. The eldest son was Parantaka, born to a Chera wife; the youngest son was Kannara Devan, born to Rashtrakuta wife. After the death of Aditya I, Rashtrakuta king Krishna II tried to establish his influence in the Chola country by placing his grandson Kannara Deva on the throne. But in 907 AD, Parantaka became the king. Disappointed by this, Krishna II invaded the Chola country. On Rashtrakuta side, prince Indra III lead the battle, while the Chola side was led by King Parantaka and Prince Rajaditya. During 911 CE in the battle of Vallala, a large number of Rashtrakuta soldiers died and their army began to weaken. Krishna II withdrew and his forces retreated. The Cholas advanced further and attacked the Rashtrakutas and chased away from their territory. Eventually the Cholas defeated the Rashtrakutas. Parantaka Chola's early series of victories would also includes this Rashtrakuta War.

Extent of Parantaka I's influence
At the height of his success, Parantaka's dominions comprised almost the whole of the Tamil country right up to Nellore in Andhra Pradesh.  It is clear from other Chola grants that Parantaka I was a great militarist who had made extensive conquests. He may have had it recorded, but those records are lost to us. He is known to have defeated the kings of Deccan kingdoms by 912 CE and completed at least temporarily the conquests started by his father Aditya.  Later in 949 CE, Rashtrakuta king Krishna III waged war against Cholas, so Parantaka sent an army under his son Rajaditya but the Cholas were defeated and crown prince Rajaditya was killed in the battlefield while sitting on elephant.

Civic and religious contributions

Although  was engaged for the greater part of his long reign in warlike operations, yet he was not unmindful of the victories of peace. The internal administration of his country was a matter in which he took a keen interest. He laid out the rules for the conduct of the village assemblies in an inscription.

The copper-plate inscriptions detail Parantaka I's promotion of agricultural prosperity by the digging of numerous canals all over the country.

He also utilised the spoils of war to donate to numerous temple charities. He is reported to have covered the Chidambaram Siva Temple with golden roof. "Thillaiyambalathhukku pon koorai veiyntha thevan" He was a devout Saiva (follower of Siva) in religion.

A record obtained from the ancient temple at Anbil near Tiruchirappalli, sung by nayanmars, which has fragmented documents dating back to at least six thousand years, informs that instituted some services in the temple with one hundred and eight servitors. However, these documents might be the information about an earlier Parantaka I since  lived before only one thousand years. These servitors worked on ancient jaiminiya recension of samaveda and continuously performed many rituals like the live vasantayaagam, somayagam, atiratram, agnihotram etc.

Personal life
From his inscriptions we can gather a few details about Parantaka I's personal life. He had many wives, of whom no fewer than eleven appear in the inscriptions. He was religious but secular and encouraged various faiths. We find various members of his family building temples and regularly making donations to various shrines across the kingdom. Kotanta Rama, incidental with Rajaditya, was the eldest son of Parantaka I. There is an inscription of him from Tiruvorriyur making a donation for some lamps during the 30th year of his father. Besides him he had several other sons; Arikulakesari, Gandaraditya and Uttamasili.

Parankata had the Chera Perumals as his close allies and the relationship was further strengthened by two marriages. The king is assumed to have married two distinct Chera princesses (the mothers of his two sons, Rajaditya and Arinjaya).

A member of the retinue of pillaiyar (prince) Rajadittadeva gave a gift to the Vishnu temple at Tirunavalur/Tirumanallur in the 32nd year of Parantaka I. Tirunavalur was also known as "Rajadittapuram" after Rajaditya. It is assumed that a large number of warriors from the aristocratic families of the Chera kingdom were part of the contingent of this Chera-Chola prince. In the 39th year of Parantaka I, his daughter-in-law, Mahadevadigal, a queen of Rajaditya and the daughter of Lataraja donated a lamp to the temple of Rajadityesvara for the merit of her brother. He had at least two daughters: Viramadevi and Anupama. Uttamasili does not appear to have lived long enough to succeed to the Chola throne.

He bore numerous epithets such as Viranarayana, Virakirti, Vira-Chola, Vikrama-Chola, Irumadi-Sola (Chola with two crowns alluding to the Chola and the Pandya kingdoms), Devendran (lord of the gods), Chakravartin (the emperor), Panditavatsalan (fond of learned men), Kunjaramallan (the wrestler with elephants) and Surachulamani (the crest jewel of the heroes).

Parantaka I died in 955.  His second son Gandaraditya succeeded him.

Inscriptions

The following is an inscription of Parantaka I from Tiruvorriyur. It is important as it shows that his dominions included regions beyond Thondaimandalam:

Here we have his son Arinjaya making a donation. Once again it is from Tiruvorriyur:

We also have several inscriptions of his son Rajaditya from Tirunavalur. One such inscription is the following from the temple of Rajadityesvara in Tirunavalur. The temple was also called Tiruttondîsvaram:

Chola-Chera Perumal relations (c. 9th-10th centuries AD)

See also 
 Battle of Takkolam

Notes

References
 Venkata Ramanappa, M. N. (1987). Outlines of South Indian History. (Rev. edn.) New Delhi:  Vikram.
 Early Chola temples:  to Rajaraja I, A.D. 907–985 By S. R. Balasubrahmanyam
 South Indian Inscriptions: Miscellaneous inscriptions in Tamil (4 pts. in 2) By Eugen Hultzsch, Hosakote Krishna Sastri, V. Venkayya, Archaeological Survey of India
 A topographical list of the inscriptions of the Madras Presidency, collected till 1915: with notes and references, Volume 1 By Vijayaraghava Rangacharya
 A topographical list of inscriptions in the Tamil Nadu and Kerala states, Volume 2 By T. V. Mahalingam
 Nilakanta Sastri, K. A. (1935). The CōĻas, University of Madras, Madras (Reprinted 1984).
 Nilakanta Sastri, K. A. (1955). A History of South India, OUP, New Delhi (Reprinted 2002).
 South Indian shrines: illustrated By P. V. Jagadisa Ayyar

Chola kings
900s births
955 deaths
10th-century Hindus
10th-century Indian monarchs
Year of birth uncertain